Mar John Menachery was the second Bishop of Apostolic Vicariate of Thrissur. He died in 1919 and was interred in the crypt of Our Lady of Lourdes Metropolitan Cathedral, Thrissur.

Notes

1857 births
1919 deaths
Archbishops of Thrissur
Syro-Malabar bishops